Majke ("mothers") are a cult Croatian rock band. Founded in 1984 in Vinkovci, Majke were one of the many bands to appear in a town that had a particularly vibrant rock and alternative scene. The band started playing under the influence of bands like: MC5, Flamin' Groovies, Steppenwolf, The Stooges, New York Dolls, Motörhead and many others.

History

1984-1989: Formation, early recordings and death of Marin Pokrovac
Majke were formed in 1984 in Vinkovci, Croatia by vocalist Goran Bare, bassist Nedjeljko Ivković - Kilmister, drummer Željko Mikulić - Korozija, and guitarists Marin Pokrovac and Ivica Duspara. They released their first demo tape in 1988 on the label Slušaj Najglasnije. The following year, some of their early recordings appeared on the legendary Slušaj Najglasnije compilation album "Bombardiranje New Yorka", which mainly consisted of recordings of rock bands from Vinkovci.

The band briefly broke up after Pokrovac moved to London. However, he soon returned to Vinkovci, and the band reformed. The reunion was tragically cut short after Pokrovac's death in 1989 when he crashed his car into the Bosut river while returning from rehearsal. Two friends of the band, Pavo Pap and Goran Matošević - Bratanac, died in the crash as well.

1990-1991: Razum I Bezumlje and first major breakup
The band decided to continue without Pokrovac. They recruited new guitarist Ivan Dujmić, and in 1990, they released their first studio album, "Razum I Bezumlje", on the independent label Search & Enjoy. The album displayed a raw and aggressive punk-influenced garage rock style, and featured several live staples such as "Iz Sve Snage", "Zbunjen I Ošamućen", "Lutak Iskrivljenog Lica", "Nikada Te Neću Zaboraviti" and "Putujem". Bare wrote the lyrics, while Duspara wrote all of the music on the album. The album was proclaimed rock album of the year by domestic audiences. However, the band's success was suddenly interrupted by the start of the Croatian War of Independence, with Vinkovci being one of the frontlines. The band soon broke up.

1992-1993: Reformation and Razdor
Bare relocated to Zagreb in 1992 and assembled a new Majke lineup consisting of original drummer Korozija, guitarist and primary songwriter Zoran Čalić, and bassist Jurica Nižić. The band recorded their second studio album "Razdor" in 1993, which was released on T.R.I.P., a sub-label of Croatia Records. The album contained popular songs such as "Budi Ponosan", "Krvarim Od Dosade", "Mršavi Pas", "'89" and "Fantastična Vatra".

Around this time, second guitarist Davor Viduka joined the band, though he did not play on Razdor. However, he and Nižić both left the band due to personal disagreements with Bare. They went on to form the successful rock band Kojoti.

1993-1994: Lineup changes and Milost
In late 1993, original bassist Kilmister returned to the band, and second guitarist Goran Dujmić joined. The band released their third studio album "Milost" the following year, on the label Heroina Nova. Despite Bare considering it to be one of Majke's weaker albums, the song "Ja Sam Budućnost" became a hit and a music video was filmed for it. Deceased guitarist Marin Pokrovac received a posthumous writing credit for the song "Postoji Nešto", while original guitarist Ivica Duspara received a writing credit for "Zauvijek". Dujmić also received writing credits for "Znam Ono Što Treba Da Znam" and "Oslobodi Se". That same year, after the birth of his son, Bare checked into rehab for heroin addiction and was clean by the summer of 1995.

1995–1997: Temporary breakup, new members, Vrijeme Je Da Se Krene and Život Uživo
In 1995, the band briefly broke up, though Bare spent several months performing under the Majke moniker with members of Kojoti as his backing band. Around this time, Bare's wife died following a heroin overdose. Bare fell into a deep depression and started using heroin again as well as drinking heavily to cope with his wife's death.

Late that year, the band reformed with a new lineup: Bare on vocals, Kilmister on bass, Čalić and Kruno Domaćinović on guitars, and Tihomir Jalšovec - Chaka on drums. The band released "Vrijeme Je Da Se Krene", their fourth and most commercially successful studio album, on Jabukaton records in 1996. Originally intended to be an EP, this album displayed a softer blues rock sound compared to their old, more aggressive garage rock style. The album had a much more sorrowful feel to it as the band was going through difficult times while recording the album, with Bare dealing with his wife's death, depression and addiction, as well as Kilmister's father dying in the middle of recording. The band utilized session musicians Davor Rodik and Gojko Tomljanović to play pedal steel guitar and keyboards respectively. The album contained several hits, the most famous being "Mene Ne Zanima", "Odvedi Me" and "A Ti Još Plačeš". A music video was filmed for Mene Ne Zanima, which won a Porin award. The title track and "Baretov Blues" became live staples as well, while original guitarist Ivica Duspara received a writing credit for "Nije Lako".

In 1997, the band released their first live album "Život Uživo", recorded at the concert venue Dom Sportova on April 25 of that year. The following year, the band won two Crni Mačak awards for best rock artist and best live performance.

1998-2000: Put Do Srca Sunca, lineup changes and second major breakup
In 1998, the band filmed a music video for a new song called "Daj Mi", announcing a new studio album. The band's fifth studio album, "Put Do Srca Sunca", was released later that year. The album displayed a  more complex and experimental style, with some songs featuring a pedal steel guitar, a Hammond organ, congas, and even a horn section.  The album contained the hit single "Grešnik", for which a music video was filmed.

A few months after the album's release, Chaka left the band and was replaced by Thomas Balaž, who previously played in the bands Anesthesia, Divlje Jagode and Teško Vrijeme, an early incarnation of Hard Time. The live album Život Uživo won a Porin award for best alternative rock album. Shortly after the Porin awards, guitarist Zoran Čalić left the band, later citing Bare's alcohol and drug abuse as one of the main reasons for his departure. The next year, Put Do Srca Sunca won a Crni Mačak award for the best cover art.

Near the end of 1999, the band recorded a new version of the song "Budi Ponosan" from their second studio album, "Razdor", to mark the band's 15th anniversary. Around this time, Bare checked into rehab for heroin addiction again, and was clean by the following year.

In the spring of 2000, the band announced that they were breaking up once again. However, they still played several shows throughout the summer due to contractual obligations. They played their final show at Bike October Fest on September 30, 2000.

After the breakup, Bare embarked on a successful solo career, releasing his first album, "Izgubljen I Nađen", in 2001, recorded with his backing band Plaćenici. Meanwhile, Čalić and Kilmister formed the band Elektrobuda, releasing an album titled "Sveti Zvuk" in 2005.

2007-2008: Reunion and Majke Unplugged
In 2007, after seven years of inactivity, most of the "Vrijeme Je Da Se Krene" lineup reunited under the moniker Goran Bare & Majke, with ex-Laufer drummer Alen Tibljaš replacing Chaka. Tibljaš had also previously played with Bare in his backing band, Plaćenici. The band also recruited a full-time keyboardist, Danko Krznarić of Cota G4. They played their first show since 2000 at the famous venue Tvornica Kulture in Zagreb on March 8, which was recorded for a live album that would not be released until 2013.

Krznarić soon left the band and was replaced by Parni Valjak keyboardist Berislav Blažević, who previously worked with Bare during his solo career, and also played keyboards on the band's 1999 re-recording of Budi Ponosan. On April 12, 2008, the band played a well received acoustic show at Tvornica Kulture, which was recorded and released as the live album "Majke Unplugged". The band continued performing live around the country, and began talks of recording a new studio album.

2009-2013: Lineup changes, Teške Boje and departure of Zoran Čalić
By the end of 2009, Kilmister, Domaćinović, Tibljaš and Blažević left the band due to personal differences with Bare. This left Bare as the only remaining original member of Majke. He and Čalić assembled a new lineup consisting of bassist Mario Rašić, who previously played with Bare in his backing band Plaćenici; Gatuzo guitarist Damir Trkulja - Šiljo, drummer Damir Šomen and keyboardist Viktor Lipić. This lineup recorded the band's sixth studio album, "Teške Boje", which was released in 2011. On this album, the band displayed a much darker and more aggressive style of blues rock, with psychedelic elements mixed in as well. The title track was a hit, with some critics even calling it the "best Croatian rock song of the last 20 years", and a music video was filmed for it. Other staples from the album included "Pozovi Me U Noć" and "Depresija". In 2012, the album won several Porin awards for song of the year, best rock album, and best music video of the year. Soon afterwards, Šiljo left the band due to personal differences with Bare and was replaced by ex-Pips, Chips i Videoclips guitarist Alen Kraljić, who also played with Bare as a member of Plaćenici.

In 2013, the band released the live album "Majke U Tvornici", which was recorded six years ago at the Tvornica Kulture venue. By the end of the year, Zoran Čalić left the band once again. He went on to form a new band called Zoran Čalić Bend. Meanwhile, Bare would keep Majke going, and the band would spend the next few years going through various personnel changes until finally assembling a stable lineup once again. At one point, the band featured two members of Kojoti; bassist Vanja Marin and keyboardist Dan Divjak, who died in 2017.

2014-present: Lineup changes and Nuspojave
On December 28, 2016, the "Vrijeme Je Da Se Krene" lineup briefly reunited at the cult Zagreb alternative nightclub Jabuka to promote the remastered version of Vrijeme Je Da Se Krene. It was the first time Bare and Kilmister spoke since 2009, as well as former drummer Chaka's first public appearance since his departure from the band in 1998.

By 2018, after years of lineup changes and rarely playing live, Bare finally assembled a stable lineup of the band once again. Guitarist Kruno Domaćinović returned to the band, along with drummer Alen Tibljaš and keyboardist Berislav Blažević. Bassist Mario Rašić returned as well, and longtime collaborator and pedal steel guitarist Davor Rodik joined the band as a permanent second guitarist.

In 2018, the new Majke lineup released their long awaited seventh studio album, "Nuspojave". This album featured a softer, more experimental and complex style compared to their previous work, with Bare comparing it to Lou Reed's work. The album contained the singles "Osvijesti Me", "Ljubav Krvari", "To Nije Igra" and "Zašto", and a music video was filmed for Osvijesti Me. The band played a well-received show at the Tvornica Kulture on November 9, 2018. A music video for To Nije Igra was filmed during the show. In 2019, the band performed a show backed by an orchestra at the Šalata stadium in Zagreb on June 1, the Ferragosto Jam festival on August 2, and another show at Tvornica Kulture on November 24.

Discography

Studio albums
Razum i bezumlje (1990)
Razdor (1993)
Milost (1994)
Vrijeme je da se krene (1996)
Put do srca sunca (1998)
Teške boje (2011)
Nuspojave (2018)

Live albums
Život uživo (1997)
Unplugged (2008)
U Tvornici (2013) – recorded in 2007

Members

Current members
Goran Bare – lead vocals
Kruno Domaćinović – lead guitarDavor Rodik – pedal steel, guitar
Mario Rašić – bass
Alen Tibljaš – drums
Bero Blažević – keyboards

Past members
Marin Pokrovac – guitars (deceased)
Ivica Duspara – guitars
Željko Mikulić - Korozija – drums, percussion
Nedjeljko Ivković – Kilmister – bass
Ivan Dujmić - Duja - guitars
Zoran Čalić – guitars
Goran Dujmić – guitars
Jurica Nižić – bass
Thomas Balaž – drums
Tihomir Jalšovec - Chaka – drums
Damir Trkulja – guitars
Mario Rašić – bass
Damir Šomen – drums, percussion
Viktor Lipić – keyboards
Alen Kraljić – guitars
Vanja Marin – bass
Davor Viduka – guitars
Mario Anušić – drums
Dan Divjak –  keyboards (deceased)

External links
https://web.archive.org/web/20110204212531/http://www.mtv.com.hr/artisti/majke 
Branislav Smuk: "Proklete majke – razum i bezumlje Gorana Bareta"

Croatian rock music groups
Yugoslav hard rock musical groups
Musical groups established in 1988
Yugoslav rock music groups